Nealcidion alboplagiatum is a full name of a group of lamiinae, a type of beetle in the family Cerambycidae. It was classified with the taxonomic classification system. They are native to Espírito Santo, a state in Brazil in South America. It was described by Martins and Monné in 1974.

References

Nealcidion
Beetles described in 1974